Cleodoxus wappesi is a species of longhorn beetles of the subfamily Lamiinae. It was described by Corbett in 2004, and is known from Costa Rica and Ecuador.

References

Beetles described in 2004
Acanthocinini